City of Workers (German: Arbeiterstadt), also translated as Working-Class City, is an oil painting on canvas completed by the Berlin Secessionist painter Hans Baluschek in 1920. The 48.44 × 36.25 in (123 × 92.1 cm) work is held at the Milwaukee Art Museum.

Description
This oil painting on canvas measures 48 7/16 × 36 1/4 in. (123 × 92 cm). It depicts a "dark and dirty" working class sector of the German capital, Berlin, in which industrial smoke dominates the skyline and the few lights of windows are drowned in the gloom. The workers' homes are concentrated in the background, while the foreground is dominated by train tracks and the white (back) light of a railway signal. In the lower left corner, standing on a train car, is a dark and mysterious figure – shown in such little detail to almost be a silhouette – wearing a coat and a hat, its back to the viewer. The figure appears to be looking over the city, with its oppressive tight spaces.

Completion and analysis
Hans Baluschek (1870–1935), the son of a railway engineer who had been active in the arts since, completed City of Workers in 1920, two years after Germany's defeat in World War I. A member of the Berlin Secession, Baluschek used an emotional technique similar to the German Expressionists in his work, but remained influenced by Realist subject matter. The city-scape, with its contradictory beauty and despair, was a common subject of his.

Catherine Sawinski, assistant curator of European art at the Milwaukee Art Museum, describes City of Workers as "a powerful critique of what political and social issues can do to ordinary citizens", one which depicts Berlin as "a menacing and dehumanizing force". Baluschek was a proponent for workers rights and a member of the Social Democratic Party.

Provenance
City of Workers was once owned by Prince Wilhelm Victor of Prussia. Later owners included Schim van der Loeff of Rotterdam and, in 1939, P. Adolf of The Hague. In 2006 the painting – expected to bring 15,000 to 20,000 euros – was sold at Sotheby's Amsterdam for 114,000 euros (US$151,506) to an American private collector. This was a record for a Baluschek work.

The painting was purchased by the Milwaukee Art Museum in October 2010 with funds from Avis Martin Heller. The painting, with the ascension number M2010.49, was displayed in the museum's Gallery 12 in September 2011, together with other works of German Expressionism, but in 2014 it was no longer on display.

References

Works cited

1920 paintings
Paintings by Hans Baluschek
Paintings in the collection of the Milwaukee Art Museum